Peter Thomas (born 20 August 2004) is an English professional footballer currently playing as a forward for College of Charleston Cougars.

Club career
Thomas became Rochdale's youngest ever player when he made his debut in the EFL Trophy against Manchester City U21, as well as being the youngest player ever to play in the competition, at the age of 15 years and 22 days old.

On 25 September 2019, ahead of the EFL Cup game between Manchester United and Rochdale at Old Trafford, in which Thomas was named on the bench for Rochdale, he was made to use the drug testing room to get changed, as competition rules stated that anyone under the age of sixteen were not permitted to get changed with senior players.

In May 2022, after two seasons with no further appearances for Rochdale, it was reported that he was still negotiating his contract with the club. In August of the same year, he went on trial with Barnsley.

College career
Thomas committed to playing collegiate soccer at the College of Charleston in November 2022.

Career statistics
.

Notes

References

2004 births
Living people
College of Charleston alumni
English footballers
Association football midfielders
Rochdale A.F.C. players
English expatriate footballers
English expatriate sportspeople in the United States
Expatriate soccer players in the United States